Maurice Peiren (28 December 1937 – 6 January 2011) was a Belgian long-distance runner. He competed in the marathon at the 1968 Summer Olympics.

References

1937 births
2011 deaths
Athletes (track and field) at the 1968 Summer Olympics
Belgian male long-distance runners
Belgian male marathon runners
Olympic athletes of Belgium
Sportspeople from West Flanders